TVI Ficção is a Portuguese basic fiber and satellite television channel owned by TVI. The channel broadcasts TVI originals, including telenovelas, sitcoms and series. It formerly also broadcast a celebrity show (Câmara Exclusiva).

As of February 2021, TVI Ficção does not broadcast any content made exclusively for the channel, which means that all of its content has already been broadcast by its free-to-air sister channel, TVI.

The channel was created after an agreement between TVI and MEO. Therefore, TVI Ficção had an exclusivity contract with that platform. The channel is also available in unrelated platforms in Portuguese-speaking African countries.

In the 18th of March, 2020 the channel was launched in the Portuguese operator NOS.

References 

Television stations in Portugal
Television channels and stations established in 2012
2012 establishments in Portugal
Televisão Independente